Detour is the eleventh studio album by American recording artist Cyndi Lauper, containing cover versions of country and western songs. It was released on May 6, 2016, and is the artist's first for Sire Records. The album was recorded in Nashville and produced by Tony Brown. In the United States, the album debuted at number 29 on the Billboard 200 and number four on the Billboard Top Country Albums and sold 36,800 copies as of September 2016.

Production and content
Lauper's 2010 album Memphis Blues contained cover versions of blues songs, with blues veterans participating. As a follow-up project, her eleventh album brings together American country music classics from the 1950s and 1960s, and features guest appearances by Vince Gill, Emmylou Harris, Alison Krauss, and Willie Nelson.

The recordings took place in Nashville, with the participation of veteran country music producer Tony Brown and local musicians. Sire Records owner Seymour Stein is the executive producer and instigator of the project. The singer said she chose country music because it is one of the styles she listened to most as a child: "When I was a really young kid, country music was pop music, so this is what we grew up listening to", she also said that: "These songs are part of some of my earliest memories so it has been an absolute thrill to revisit them."

About the experience with the album and the recordings in Nashville, the singer said: "It was exciting to come here and make a record that’s an homage to country", "It's a real singer’s album."

Critical reception

Detour received positive reviews from critics. At Metacritic, which assigns a normalized rating out of 100 to reviews from mainstream critics, Detour has an average score of 63 based on 11 reviews, indicating "generally favorable reviews". Music critic Keith Harris of Rolling Stone magazine wrote "Aging rock and pop stars often seek a late-career safe harbor in country music, but 62-year-old Cyndi Lauper tackles the genre with characteristically daring eccentricity." John Paul of PopMatters wrote "Not entirely successful yet not entirely without merit, Cyndi Lauper’s work on Detour is just that: a detour from the norm and an attempt at finding something new in something old." Stephen Thomas Erlewine from AllMusic website gave the album three out of five stars and wrote that the record is "equally enamored of cowboy camp as it is of Music City craft and corn" and that " [if the album is] taken as a collection of performances and not a coherent record, it's fun". Jonathan Riggs from Idolator website gave the album three out of five stars and wrote that "is a bold and exciting move from a true maverick who, throughout all her experimentations, remains instantly recognizable and ever-lovable" he also wrote that the album is the one "Del Rubio Triplets never recorded, but thankfully for us dimestore cowgirls and cowboys, Cyndi did."

Commercial performance
Detour debuted at number 29 on the US Billboard 200. and in the United Kingdom, at number 43 on the UK Albums (OCC). The album debuted at No. 4 on Billboards Top Country Albums chart, selling 16,100 copies in its first week. The album has sold 36,800 copies as of September 2016.

Track listing

Personnel

 Cyndi Lauper – lead vocals, producer
 Jewel – duet vocals on "I Want to Be a Cowboy's Sweetheart"
 Alison Krauss – duet vocals on "Hard Candy Christmas"
 Emmylou Harris – duet vocals on "Detour"
 Willie Nelson – acoustic guitar and duet vocals on "Night Life"
 Vince Gill – acoustic and electric guitar and duet vocals on "You're the Reason Our Kids Are Ugly"
 Bryan Sutton – acoustic guitar
 Tom Bukovac – acoustic guitar
 Kenny Greenberg – acoustic and electric guitar
 Dan Dugmore – steel guitar
 Willie Weeks – bass guitar
 Jimmie Lee Sloas – bass guitar
 Aubrey Haynie – fiddle, mandolin
 Steve Nathan – Hammond B-3 organ, piano, synthesizer, Wurlitzer electric piano
 Tony Brown – piano, producer
 Jeff Taylor – accordion
 Chad Cromwell – drums
 Greg Morrow – drums
 Elaine Caswell – background vocals
 Perry Coleman – background vocals
 Neal Coomer – background vocals
 Kim Keyes – background vocals
 Lisa Barbaris – executive producer
 Seymour Stein – executive producer
 Amy Garges –  production assistant
 Shawn Pelton – engineer
 Seth Morton – assistant engineer
 Brandon Schexnayder – assistant engineer
 Mike Stankiewicz – assistant engineer
 William Wittman – engineer, mixing
 David Thoener – engineer, mixing
 Ryan Smith – mastering
 Rick Wilkins – arranger
 Ernie Freeman – arranger

Charts

Weekly charts

Year-end charts

References

2016 albums
Cyndi Lauper albums
Albums produced by Tony Brown (record producer)
Sire Records albums
Country rock albums by American artists
Covers albums